Het Verdronken Land van Reimerswaal (translation: The Drowned Land of Reimerswaal) is an area of flood-covered land in Zeeland in the Netherlands between Noord Beveland and Bergen op Zoom. Some of it was lost in the St. Felix's Flood in 1530, and some of it in 1532. The Oosterschelde formerly flowed along its east and north edges. It is sometimes divided into the "Verdronken Land van Zuid-Beveland" and the "Verdronken Land van de Markiezaat van Bergen op Zoom". Verdronken is Dutch for "drowned", and Markizaat van Bergen op Zoom is the marquisate of Bergen op Zoom).

The Dutch land reclamation engineer and writer Vierlingh blamed the loss of that land on a landowner called the Lord of Lodijke neglecting a tidal creek which was scouring at every tide. After the land was lost, the city of Reimerswaal survived on a small island for a while.

See also 
 Drowned villages in the Drowned Land of Reimerswaal
 List of settlements lost to floods in the Netherlands

External links

References

Floods in the Netherlands
History of Zeeland
Landforms of Zeeland
Reimerswaal (municipality)
Zuid-Beveland